Khasham is a Syrian town located in Deir ez-Zor District, Deir ez-Zor.  According to the Syria Central Bureau of Statistics (CBS), Khasham had a population of 7,021 in the 2004 census.

See also

 Battle of Khasham

References 

Populated places in Deir ez-Zor Governorate
Populated places on the Euphrates River